The 2010 Internazionali Femminili di Palermo was a tennis tournament played on outdoor clay courts. It was the 23rd edition of the Internazionali Femminili di Palermo, part of the WTA International tournaments of the 2010 WTA Tour. It took place in Palermo, Italy, from July 12 through July 18, 2010.

WTA entrants

Seeds 

* Seedings are based on the rankings of July 5, 2010.

Other entrants 
The following players received wildcards into the singles main draw
  Anna Floris
  Romina Oprandi
  Flavia Pennetta

The following players received entry from the qualifying draw:
  Martina Caregaro
  Corinna Dentoni
  Nuria Llagostera Vives
  Mirjana Lučić
  Anastasia Pivovarova (as a Lucky loser)

Champions

Singles 

 Kaia Kanepi def.  Flavia Pennetta, 6–4, 6–3
It was Kanepi's first career title.

Doubles 

 Alberta Brianti /  Sara Errani def.  Jill Craybas /  Julia Görges 6–4, 6–1

External links 
 

Internazionali Femminili di Palermo
Internazionali Femminili di Palermo
2010 in Italian women's sport
July 2010 sports events in Italy
Torneo